The Adventurer was a game magazine published by LucasArts from Fall 1990 to Winter 1996. Designed as a consumer-facing company newsletter, it promoted upcoming LucasArts releases and featured background information on their development in the form of essays and staff interviews. In addition to printed copies which were distributed free of charge, LucasArts also published selected articles on their website.

Despite the magazine's name, The Adventurer did not focus exclusively on adventure games, but covered all kinds of titles published by LucasArts.

Issues
Over the course of the magazine's 6-year run, a total of 13 issues were released. Due to issue number 13 being skipped, the magazine's final issue was #14, published at the end of 1996.

References

1990 establishments in California
1996 disestablishments in California
Defunct computer magazines published in the United States
Magazines established in 1990
Magazines disestablished in 1996
Magazines published in San Francisco
Video game magazines published in the United States